Clemens House—Columbia Brewery District is a historic district in St. Louis, Missouri.  Bounded by Maiden Lane, Cass Ave., Twenty-first, Helen, and Howard Sts., the district was added to the National Register of Historic Places in 1984.

A boundary increase,  roughly bounded by St. Louis Ave., N. Florissant Ave., Maiden Lane, and N. Twenty-first and N. Twentieth Sts. was added in 1986.  The district includes single dwellings, at least one religious structure and manufacturing facilities.

Architectural styles include  Mid 19th Century Revival, Late 19th And 20th Century Revivals, Romanesque and Late Victorian.

References

Houses on the National Register of Historic Places in Missouri
Buildings and structures in St. Louis
Houses in St. Louis
Historic districts on the National Register of Historic Places in Missouri
National Register of Historic Places in St. Louis